John L. Pingel (September 14, 1834 – February 28, 1923) was an American farmer, businessman, and politician.

Born in Domsuhl, Mecklenburg-Schwerin, Germany, Pingel emigrated to the United States in 1852 and settled in New York. He then moved to the town of Greenville, Outagamie County, Wisconsin and settled on a farm. In 1887, Pingel sold the farm and started a farm implement business. Pingel served as chairman of the Greenville Town Board and as town clerk. He also served as justice of the peace. In 1882 and 1883, Pingel served in the Wisconsin State Senate as a Democrat. Pingel died from pneumonia while living at his daughter's home in Portland, Oregon.

Notes

1834 births
1923 deaths
German emigrants to the United States
People from Greenville, Wisconsin
Businesspeople from Wisconsin
Farmers from Wisconsin
Mayors of places in Wisconsin
Democratic Party Wisconsin state senators
Deaths from pneumonia in Oregon